Palakkad Road, is an arterial road in Coimbatore, India. This road connects the city to Palakkad and the state of Kerala and the south-west suburbs in the Coimbatore metropolitan area.

Description
Palakkad Road is the main gateway into the city by road from Palakkad, Thrissur, Ernakulam and Walayar. This road is a part of National highways 544 (Salem - Kochin Highway) is now maintained by the National Highways Authority of India. This road is a 7-km stretch of road running diagonally across the city in east–west orientation. Pollachi road starts near to Aathupalam in Karumbukkadai, and it passes through the important neighbourhoods of Kuniyamuthur, Marapalam and Madukkarai.

Alignment
The road is a two lane road in most stretches.

Traffic congestion
The road was previously part of the NH-47 maintained by the National Highways Authority of India. The L&T Bypass was opened in 2000 from Neelambur to Madukkarai, thereby decongesting the Palakkad road.

The Western bypass is proposed as well to decongest the road.

Places transversed 
Aathupalam Junction
Kuniyamuthur junction
Edayarpalayam Pirivu junction
Madukkarai junction
L&T Bypass Signal junction

Major Educational Institutions 
Nehru Group of Institutions

Major Hospitals 
KJ Hospitals

References 

Central business districts in India
Roads in Coimbatore